Manuel Vilerio Rodriguez (born 17 February 1967) is a Gibraltarian professional darts player who plays in Professional Darts Corporation (PDC) events.

Career
He represented Gibraltar in the PDC World Cup of Darts in 2015 and 2016, along with Dyson Parody.

He has fifth appearance in the Gibraltar Darts Trophy since 2013, then he losing to Dave Chisnall in 2013, Dean Winstanley in 2014, Brian Woods in 2015, Darren Johnson in 2017.

References

External links
Profile and stats on Darts Database

1967 births
Living people
Gibraltarian darts players
Professional Darts Corporation associate players
PDC World Cup of Darts Gibraltarian team